North Dakota Highway 44 (ND 44) is a  north–south state highway in the U.S. state of North Dakota. ND 44's southern terminus is at Interstate 29 (I 29) south of Drayton, and the northern terminus is at ND 66 in Drayton.

Major intersections

References

044
Transportation in Pembina County, North Dakota
Transportation in Walsh County, North Dakota